New Panteg Rugby Football Club is a rugby union team from the village of New Inn, in Pontypool, Wales. The club is a member of the Welsh Rugby Union and is a feeder club for the Newport Gwent Dragons.

Notable former players
 Taulupe Faletau (86 test caps for Wales, 4 for the British & Irish Lions)
 Mako Vunipola (67 test caps for England, 7 for the British & Irish Lions)
 Billy Vunipola (60 test caps for England)

References

External links
New Panteg RFC

Welsh rugby union teams